The Merrimack Warriors men's soccer program represents the Merrimack College in all NCAA Division I men's college soccer competitions. Founded in 1970, the Warriors compete in the Northeast Conference. The Warriors are coached by Tony Martone, who has coached the program for 39 years, the longest of any NCAA men's program. Merrimack play their home matches at Martone-Mejail Field.

In 2019, the Warriors began play in Division I, reclassified from Division II. In their inaugural Division I season, the Warriors earned their first Northeast Conference regular season championship and fifth overall. Due to their reclassification, they could not compete in the NEC Tournament.

Coaching history

References

External links 
 

 
1970 establishments in Massachusetts
Association football clubs established in 1970